The Cedar Valley Group is a geologic group in Iowa and Illinois. It preserves fossils dating back to the Devonian period.

See also

 List of fossiliferous stratigraphic units in Iowa
 List of fossiliferous stratigraphic units in Illinois

References
 

Geologic groups of Iowa
Geologic groups of Illinois